Joseph Daniel Unwin MC (1895–1936) was an English ethnologist and social anthropologist at Oxford University and Cambridge University.

Contributions to anthropology 
In Sex and Culture (1934), Unwin studied 80 primitive tribes and six known civilizations through 5,000 years of history. He claimed there was a positive correlation between the cultural achievement of a people and the sexual restraint they observe. Aldous Huxley described Sex and Culture as "a work of the highest importance" in his literature.

According to Unwin, after a nation becomes prosperous, it becomes increasingly liberal concerning sexual morality. It thus loses its cohesion, impetus, and purpose, which he claims is irrevocable. 

Unwin also stated "In the past, too, the greatest energy has been displayed only by those societies which have reduced their sexual opportunity to a minimum by the adoption of absolute monogamy (para. 168). In every case the women and children were reduced to the level of legal nonentities, sometimes also to the level of chattels, always to the level of mere appendages of the male estate. Eventually they were freed from their disadvantages, but at the same time the sexual opportunity of the society was extended. Sexual desires could then be satisfied in a direct or perverted manner…  So the energy of the society decreased, and then disappeared."  He points out that "No society has yet to succeeded in regulating the relations between the sexes in such a Way as to enable sexual opportunity to remain at a minimum for an extended period." – and thus all societies have collapsed.  His hope for the future is that "by placing the sexes on a level of complete legal equality, and then by altering its economic and social organization in such a way as to render it both possible and tolerable for sexual opportunity to remain at a minimum for an extended period" a society may flourish.  Although he offers no data to support his hope.

Works
 Sexual Regulations and Human Behaviour. London: Williams & Norgate, 1933.
 Sex and Culture. London: Oxford University Press, 1934.
 The Scandal of Imprisonment for Debt. London: Simpkin Marshall, 1935.
 Sexual Regulations and Cultural Behaviour. London: Oxford University Press, 1935.
 Sex Compatibility in Marriage. New York: Rensselaer, 1939.
 Hopousia: Or, The Sexual and Economic Foundations of a New Society, with an introduction by Aldous Huxley. New York: Oskar Piest, 1940.
 Our Economic Problems and Their Solution (An Extract from "Hopousia.") London: George Allen & Unwin, Ltd., 1944.

Selected articles
 "Monogamy as a Condition of Social Energy,” The Hibbert Journal, Vol. XXV, 1927.
 "The Classificatory System of Relationship," Man, Vol. XXIX, Sep., 1929.
 "Kinship," Man, Vol. XXX, Apr., 1930.
 "Reply to Dr. Morant's 'Cultural Anthropology and Statistics'," Man, Vol. XXXV, Mar., 1935.

Other
 Dark Rapture: The Sex-life of the African Negro, with an Introduction by J. D. Unwin. New York: Walden Publication, 1939.

See also
 Bronisław Malinowski
 Pitirim Sorokin
 Sigmund Freud

References

Further reading
 Firth, Raymond (1936). "Sex and Culture," Africa, Vol. 9, No. 1, pp. 126–129.
 Morant, G. M. (1935). "Cultural Anthropology and Statistics; A One-Sided Review of 'Sex and Culture'," Man, Vol. 35, pp. 34–39.

External links
 Obituary
 
 Works by J. D. Unwin, at Hathi Trust
 Unwin, Joseph Daniel
 Sex and Culture

1895 births
1936 deaths
British ethnologists
British anthropologists
Recipients of the Military Cross
Social anthropologists
Academics of the University of Cambridge
Academics of the University of Oxford
20th-century anthropologists
Male feminists